The Laurence Olivier Award for Best Performance in a Musical was an annual award presented by the Society of London Theatre in recognition of achievements in commercial London theatre. The awards were established as the Society of West End Theatre Awards in 1976, and renamed in 1984 in honour of English actor and director Laurence Olivier.

This commingled actor/actress award was introduced in 1977, was also presented in 1978, then in 1979 was replaced by newly created awards for Best Actress in a Musical and Best Actor in a Musical.

On the two occasions that this commingled award was given, it was presented to an actress.

Award winners

1970s

References

External links
 

Laurence Olivier Awards
Theatre acting awards